Ravaged is a multiplayer first-person shooter video game featuring vehicular combat. Developed by American studio 2 Dawn Games, the game was partly funded through Kickstarter, raising $38,767 on the platform in May 2012.

Downloadable content 
In August 2013, the game received the free Zombie Apocalypse DLC, introducing a co-operative multiplayer mode where players must escape zombie hordes.

Reception 

The game received mixed reviews upon release, garnering a score of 64 out of 100 on the review aggregation website Metacritic.

References 

2012 video games
First-person shooter multiplayer online games
Kickstarter-funded video games
Crowdfunded video games
Post-apocalyptic video games
Unreal Engine games
Vehicular combat games
Video games developed in the United States
Windows games
Windows-only games
Video games about zombies